Shinkailepas kaikatensis is a species of sea snail, a false limpet, a marine gastropod mollusk in the family Phenacolepadidae.

It was first described by Okutani, Saito and Hashimoto in 1989.

Description
The individuals in the NOAA image are adults of 2 cm (0.75 in) living on rock surfaces at a hydrothermal vent at the East Diamante seamount, which is west-southwest of the small island of Farallon de Medinilla in the Southern Seamount Province of the Mariana Islands. The hydrothermal vent at East Diamante is "shallower than 200 m (650 ft)" according to the NOAA description. The white dots on the rocks and on the limpet shells in this image are the egg capsules of the species.

References

External links
 NOAA info and source of the image
 WoRMS info

Phenacolepadidae
Gastropods described in 1989